The 2014 Doncaster Metropolitan Borough Council election took place on 22 May 2014 as part of the 2014 local elections in the United Kingdom. One third of 63 seats were up for election. The 2014 European Parliament Elections were also held on the same day.

The election resulted in the Labour Party retaining its control of the council, with a slightly reduced majority after losing two seats overall. UKIP won a substantial number of votes at this election, increasing its vote share by 30.5%, but only won a single seat. The Liberal Democrats lost the only seat they were defending. After the election, the composition of the council was:
Labour 48
Conservative 8
UKIP 1
Others 6

Result

Ward results
The results in each ward are shown below. Changes are compared with the previous election in 2010.

Adwick

Armthorpe

Askern Spa

Balby

Bentley

Bessacarr & Cantley

Central

Conisbrough & Denaby

Edenthorpe, Kirk Sandall & Barnby Dun

Edlington & Warmsworth

Finningley

Great North Road

Hatfield

Mexborough

Rossington

Sprotbrough

Stainforth & Moorends

Thorne

Torne Valley

Town Moor

Wheatley

References

2014 English local elections
2014
2010s in South Yorkshire